"Snail Shell" is a song by American alternative rock band They Might Be Giants. It was released on August 15, 1994 as the lead promotional single off of their fifth album, John Henry. It peaked at 19 on the Billboard Hot Modern Rock Tracks chart. This was a commercial disappointment for the band, as the song was perceived by the band as having the potential to be as successful as their breakthrough hit, Birdhouse in Your Soul. The day after the single's release, the group put out the E.P. Back to Skull, which features the song along with a version remixed by The Dust Brothers entitled "Snail Dust".

The song, if taken literally, regards a snail who wishes to direct gratitude to an unknown person for, as he puts it, "putting me back in my snail shell".

Lyrics 
The song is written in first-person. The title snail states that he "fell out of my right place again." He politely attempts to get the attention of its savior, before profusely thanking them for returning him to his shell.

Music video 
The song's video, which was directed by Nico Beyer in July 1994, was filmed in a television museum in Berlin during a heat wave. Brian Doherty and Tony Maimone, respectively the drummer and bassist on the track, would have been replaced by German actors miming their parts, had they not realized the day before the shoot that they didn't have plane tickets.

Track listing 
 CD single

 "Snail Shell" – 3:20

Personnel 

 John Flansburgh – guitar, vocals
 John Linnell – keyboards, vocals
 Brian Doherty – drums
 Tony Maimone – bass

References

External links 

 "Snail Shell" at This Might Be A Wiki
 Snail Shell Single on This Might Be A Wiki

1994 singles
They Might Be Giants songs
1994 songs
Elektra Records singles
Songs written by John Linnell
Songs written by John Flansburgh